Fejd is a Swedish folk band formed in 2001.

History 
In 2001, Patrik and Niklas Rimmerfors (both once played as a duo under the name Rimmerfors) joined forces with their musicians Lennart Specht, Thomas Antonsson and Esko Salow to form the band Fejd. Specht, Antonsson and Salow also played together in Pathos and Nostradameus. The band made their first appearances in 2002. After three self-produced demos and EPs, their debut album Storm was released via Napalm Records in 2009. In the same year, the band participated in Wacken Open Air.

Musical style
Fejd's music is rooted in the typical melodic themes of the Nordic folk music and neofolk with rock influence. They usually incorporate a diverse selection of folk instruments, such as moraharpa, bouzouki, jew's harp, säckpipa, hurdy-gurdy and many others. Since 2016's Trolldom, the metal elements are more prominent in the band's music. Their lyrics are mostly written in Swedish.

Personnel 
 Patrik Rimmerfors - lead vocals, bouzouki, säckpipa, jaw harp, hurdy-gurdy, cow antler, recorder, willow pipe (2001–present)
 Niklas Rimmerfors - nyckelharpa, backing vocals (2001–present)
 Lennart Specht - keyboards (2001–present)
 Thomas Antonsson - bass (2001–present)
 Esko Salow - drums,  percussion (2001–present)
 Per-Owe Solvelius - guitars (2015–present)

Discography 
Studio albums
 Storm (2009)
 Eifur (2010)
 Nagelfar (2013)
 Trolldom (2016)

EP
 Eld (2006)

Demo
 I en tid som var (2002)
 Huldran (2004)

References

External links

 Fejd - Metal Archives

Swedish musical groups
Swedish-language musical groups